Prossa is a lake in central Estonia, north of the capital Tartu and close to the border with Russia.

See also
List of lakes of Estonia

Lakes of Estonia
Jõgeva Parish
Lakes of Jõgeva County